This is a list of WBO world champions, showing every world champion certified by the World Boxing Organization (WBO). The WBO is one of the four major governing bodies in professional boxing, and has awarded world championships in 17 different weight classes since 1989.

Boxers who won the title but were stripped due to the title bout being overturned to a no contest are not listed.

Heavyweight

Junior heavyweight
This weight class is designated as cruiserweight by the WBA, WBC, and IBF.

Light heavyweight

Super middleweight

Middleweight

Junior middleweight

Welterweight

Junior welterweight

Lightweight

Junior lightweight

Featherweight

Junior featherweight

Bantamweight

Junior bantamweight

Flyweight

Junior flyweight

Mini flyweight

See also
List of current world boxing champions
List of undisputed boxing champions
List of WBA world champions
List of WBC world champions
List of IBF world champions
List of The Ring world champions
List of WBO female world champions
List of IBO world champions

References

External links
Official list of current WBO champions

WBO

WBO